Mitozolomide (INN) is an antineoplastic. It is an imidazotetrazine derivative.

Development of mitozolomide was discontinued during Phase II clinical trials after it was found to cause severe and unpredictable bone marrow suppression. Temozolomide, which has been in clinical use since 1999, is a less toxic analogue of mitozolomide.

References

Abandoned drugs
Imidazotetrazines
Carboxamides
Organochlorides